The Italian Socialist Party (PSI) is a social-democratic political party in Italy. The party was founded in 2007–2008 by the merger of the following social-democratic parties and groups: Enrico Boselli's Italian Democratic Socialists (legal successor of the Italian Socialist Party), the faction of the New Italian Socialist Party led by Gianni De Michelis, The Italian Socialists of Bobo Craxi, Democracy and Socialism of Gavino Angius, the Association for the Rose in the Fist of Lanfranco Turci, Socialism is Freedom of Rino Formica and some other minor organisations. Until October 2009, the party was known as Socialist Party  (PS).

From 2008 to 2019, Riccardo Nencini from Tuscany has been party leader. Elected senator with the Democratic Party in 2013 and re-elected in 2018, he was Deputy Minister of Infrastructures and Transports from 2014 to 2019 (Renzi Cabinet and Gentiloni Cabinet). In March 2019, Nencini stepped down as secretary and was replaced by Enzo Maraio, from Campania. Since September 2019, the PSI sits within the parliamentary group of Italia Viva in the Senate.

History

Foundation 
A merger of all the parties hailing from the tradition of the Italian Socialist Party (PSI) (disbanded in 1994 as a result of Tangentopoli scandals) and the Italian Democratic Socialist Party (PSDI) was initially proposed by Enrico Boselli during a congress of his Italian Democratic Socialists (SDI) in April 2007. In that occasion, the party decided not to join the Democratic Party (PD) and called for a Socialist Constituent Assembly (Costituente Socialista) instead.

Some minor parties and associations, including The Italian Socialists of Bobo Craxi, Socialism is Freedom of Rino Formica and the Association for the Rose in the Fist of Lanfranco Turci, immediately welcomed Boselli's proposal, while in June 2007 the New Italian Socialist Party (NPSI) divided in two groups: the first, led by Stefano Caldoro and Lucio Barani, opted to join The People of Freedom and retained the NPSI identity; the second, led by Mauro Del Bue and Gianni De Michelis, agreed to join the Socialist Constituent Assembly. Indeed, the two factions elected their secretary in two separate congresses: on 24 June Caldoro was elected secretary by the right-wing faction of the party, while on 7–8 July Del Bue and De Michelis were elected respectively secretary and president by those members who wanted to take part to the foundation of the Socialist Party, whose first meeting took place on 14 July. In practice, for some time the NPSI had two secretaries. Subsequently, on 24 October 2007, the two MEPs elected on the United Socialists for Europe list in the 2004 European Parliament election, De Michelis and Alessandro Battilocchio, joined the Socialist Group in the European Parliament.

At its foundation in October 2007, the Socialist Party (PS) was joined also by Gavino Angius's Democracy and Socialism, a group of former Democrats of the Left most recently affiliated with the Democratic Left.

At the 2008 general election, the PS stood alone and Boselli was its candidate for Prime Minister. In the event, the party gained less than 1% of the vote (well below thresholds) and failed to win any seats in the Italian Parliament.

Out of Parliament 
At the first party congress, which took place in July 2008, Riccardo Nencini was elected secretary (replacing Boselli) while Pia Locatelli was elected president. In September, Nencini proposed a new "reformist axis" comprising the Democratic Party (PD), the Union of Christian and Centre Democrats (UDC) and the Socialists while explaining that the Democrats needed to choose between the reformism of the PS and the populism of Italy of Values (IdV). In October 2008, Angius led his group into the PD, proposing that the entire PS should follow him. In reply, Nencini underlined that no former members of the late PSI were leaving the party. In fact, Spini, the only former Socialist in Angius' group, chose to stay in the PS. However, De Michelis left the party soon after.

For the 2009 European Parliament election, the PS formed a joint list named Left and Freedom (SL) with the Movement for the Left (MpS), the Federation of the Greens (FdV), the Democratic Left (SD) and Unite the Left (UlS). SL received a mere 3.1% of the vote and failed to return any MEPs. Despite this, the national council of the PS chose to continue the experience of SL to build a "secular, libertarian and left-wing" force. This led to the exit of Craxi, who launched the United Socialists in October. However, one month later the PS left SL (later rebranded Left Ecology Freedom, SEL), having refused a full merger. The PS was renamed Italian Socialist Party (PSI), chose to support joint candidates with the PD and to run its own lists in the forthcoming regional elections, opening the way to Craxi's return.

At the 2010 regional elections, the PSI elected a total of 15 regional councillors. The party obtained its best results in Apulia (9.7% with SEL and 4 councillors out of the 11 elected by SEL), Basilicata (4.6% and 1 councillor), Umbria (4.2% and 2 councillors), Campania (3.5% with SEL and 2 councillors out of 2) and Calabria (3.7%, just 0.3% short of the electoral threshold). At the second party congress in July, Nencini was re-elected secretary, but the party was divided between three political lines: the majority around Nencini supported a "reformist" alliance with the PD, UDC and SEL (excluding IdV and the Communist Refoundation Party), the right "autonomist" wing led by Craxi wanted the party to stand alone and the left "frontist" wing favoured stronger co-operation with SEL.

In December 2010, Boselli, long-time SDI leader and PSI founder, who had left active politics after his 2008 defeat, joined the Alliance for Italy (ApI), led by Francesco Rutelli.

Return to Parliament 
In November 2011, Carlo Vizzini, a senator of The People of Freedom (PdL) and former leader of the PSDI, joined the party, giving it parliamentary representation after more than three years. While leaving the PdL, Vizzini stated: "It seems to me that the PdL is set to become the Italian section of the European People's Party. I come from another tradition: I have been secretary of the PSDI and I was one of the founders of the Party of European Socialists. When I joined Forza Italia there were Liberals, Socialists, Radicals. Now everything has changed". Vizzini was soon elected president of the PSI.

The party did well in the 2012 local elections. In Carrara, the Socialist mayor Angelo Zubbani was re-elected by a landslide and the party obtained 14.4% of the vote. The PSI also won 15.1% in Todi, 8.9% in Narni, 7.2% in Civitanova Marche, 9.5% in Frosinone, 11.8% in Paola and 9.4% in Trapani.

In the 2013 general election, the PSI was part of the Italy. Common Good coalition headed by PD leader Pier Luigi Bersani, whom the PSI had supported in the centre-left primary election. The party obtained 4 deputies and 2 senators, including Nencini, from the lists of the PD and right after supported Enrico Letta's government. During the third party congress in November 2013, Nencini was re-elected secretary, beating Franco Bartolomei of the "frontist" left and Angelo Sollazzo of the "autonomist" wing. In 2015, Bartolomei, Alberto Benzoni and Felice Besostri set up the leftist Socialist Risorgimento and were excluded from the party.

Renzi Cabinet and splits 

When Letta was replaced by Matteo Renzi with strong support from the PSI in February 2014, Nencini was appointed Deputy Minister of Infrastructures and Transports in Renzi Cabinet. In the summer of 2015, Marco Di Lello, party leader in the Chamber, went so far as proposing the merger of the PSI into the PD and announced that were the party not to follow his proposal, he would join the PD. In November, Di Lello along with Lello Di Gioia, another deputy, left the PSI and formed along with a deputy of the PD the Socialists and Democrats (S&D) as a faction within the PD. Contextually, Carmelo Lo Monte, elected in 2013 with the Democratic Centre, joined the PSI's sub-group and the party as a full member.

During the fourth party congress in April 2016, Nencini was unopposed. However, Socialist Area, a faction launched in November 2015 by Bobo Craxi, Roberto Biscardini, Gerardo Labellarte and Angelo Sollazzo, who criticised the party's "acritical" support to Renzi Cabinet and Nencini's double role as party leader and deputy minister while proposing a more left-wing positionment for the party as opposed to PD–PSI's "centrism", chose not to participate in the congress, a decision that marked the split from the party. Otherwise, the party was endorsed by Tommaso Nannicini, Renzi's undersecretary and economic advisor.

The PSI did well in the 2016 local elections. In Città di Castello, the Socialist mayor Luciano Bacchetta was re-elected in the first round and the party obtained 21.5% of the vote. The PSI also won 11.7% in Finale Emilia, 10.2% in Sulmona, 14.7% in Frattaminore, 8.2% in Salerno, 12.1% in Melfi and 10.1% in Cassano all'Ionio.

Nencini was confirmed as Deputy Minister of Infrastructures and Transports in the government led by Paolo Gentiloni (PD) in December 2016.

In the 2017 local elections, the party obtained its best results in Nocera Inferiore (13.2%), Palmi (12.0%), Galatina (9.5%), Narni (8.6%) and Trapani (8.8%) while losing ground in its historical stronghold of Carrara (6.5%), where a Socialist was the incumbent term-limited mayor. In September 2017, Michela Marzano, originally elected with the PD, joined the PSI sub-group in the Chamber as an independent while Lo Monte left in November.

2018 general and 2019 EP elections 
In the run-up to the 2018 general election the PSI, the Greens and Civic Area formed the Together electoral list. The list obtained a mere 0.6% of the vote and no seats, but Nencini was re-elected to the Senate from the single-seat constituency of Arezzo and Fausto Longo was elected in an overseas constituency from the PD's list. Nencini joined the Mixed Group, while Longo joined a sub-group of the Mixed Group composed of minor centre-left parties, such as Popular Alternative.

In March 2019, during a party congress, Enzo Maraio was elected secretary to replace Nencini, who was later elected president.

In the run up to the 2019 European Parliament election the PSI formed an electoral pact with More Europe, a liberal party.

In September 2019 the PSI was instrumental in the formation of the parliamentary group of Italia Viva, Renzi's new party, in the Senate.

2022 general election 

In July 2022, the party announced it would join the Democratic and Progressive Italy list led by Enrico Letta, within the centre-left coalition, for the 2022 general election.

Popular support 
Similarly to its precursors (SI, SDI and NPSI), the PSI has its strongholds in Southern and Central Italy.

In the 2008 general election, the first and latest general election the PSI fought with its own list, the party obtained 1.8% in Umbria, 2.0% in Calabria (2.8% for the Senate), 2.8% in Basilicata and 1.6% in Apulia. In the 2010 regional elections, the party confirmed its strength in its strongholds: 4.2% in Umbria, 3.7% in Calabria, 4.6% in Basilicata, 9.7% in Apulia (along with SEL) and 3.5% in Campania. In the 2013 regional election, the party increased its percentage of the vote to 7.5% in Basilicata.

In the 2015 regional elections, the party formed joint lists with the PD in several cases while obtaining 3.5% in Umbria with its own list.

Electoral results

Italian Parliament

European Parliament

Regional Councils

Leadership 
Secretary: Enrico Boselli (2007–2008), Riccardo Nencini (2008–2019), Enzo Maraio (2019–present)
Coordinator: Marco Di Lello (2008–2014), Gian Franco Schietroma (2014–2018), Luigi Iorio (2019–present)
Treasurer: Oreste Pastorelli (2008–2022), Marco Strada (2022–president)
President: Pia Locatelli (2008–2010), Carlo Vizzini (2014–2019), Riccardo Nencini (2019–2022), Luigi Incarnato (2022–present)

See also 
 List of political parties in Italy

References

External links 
 Official website

Party of European Socialists member parties
Political parties established in 2007
Full member parties of the Socialist International
Social democratic parties in Italy
2007 establishments in Italy